Jacquelyn Suzette Wright-Johnson (born May 17, 1977), better known by her stage name, Jaguar Wright, is an American R&B and neo soul singer, songwriter and narrator.  She is part of the Okayplayer collective. Wright has performed and collaborated alongside rap acts such as The Roots, Jay-Z, and Blackalicious.  She was born and raised in New Jersey before moving to Philadelphia at around 12 years old.

Career

Wright was brought to the attention of hip-hop group The Roots in 1998, which eventually led to her going on tour with them.  She later appeared on MTV Unplugged as a back-up singer for Jay-Z in 2001, and was featured in a Coca-Cola advert as part of the brand's "Nu Soul" campaign. She has released two solo albums to date: Denials, Delusions & Decisions in 2002, and Divorcing Neo 2 Marry Soul in 2005.  Wright also recorded an album titled ...And Your Point Is? which was due for release in 2003 on MCA Records (who also distributed her debut), before the label folded. Many of the tracks recorded for that album later appeared on Divorcing Neo 2 Marry Soul.

Wright has toured every year since her debut album was released. In March 2008, she toured Europe with Bahamadia and Hezekiah for the "Philly Sounds" tour. Wright did not perform any new material on the tour, but did live cover versions of Cherrelle's "Saturday Love" and Crystal Waters' "Gypsy Woman (She's Homeless)". During the tour, Wright announced that she was in the process of writing a novel, and working on a third album. No release dates have been confirmed for either as of yet.

In 2019, Wright released the 5-song EP titled "Lost" on Bandcamp. In 2020, Wright made headlines via social media regarding issues such as the trajectory of her music career, her fallout with several members of the Roots, and her grievances with artists such as Jill Scott, Erykah Badu and Mary J. Blige, as well as a claim that her then boyfriend Common sexually assaulted her after performing a concert in the mid-2000s. In 2022, Wright made headlines once again when she did an interview speaking on the dark side of the Hip-Hop music industry.

Discography

Studio albums

Unreleased albums

Singles 
as lead artist

as featured artist

Album appearances

References

External links

 at Okayplayer

1977 births
21st-century American singers
Musicians from Philadelphia
American neo soul singers
Living people
21st-century American women singers